Taihe is a town under the administration of Guiyang County, Hunan, China. , it administers Taihe Residential Community and the following 13 villages:
Wantang Village
Zhutang Village
Tansha Village
Sheyuan Village
Dijie Village
Shenxia Village
Chetian Village
Changle Village
Qinghe Village
Xikou Village
Dangjia Village
Tuanjie Village
Furong Yao Ethnic Village

See also 
 List of township-level divisions of Hunan

References 

Towns of Chenzhou
Divisions of Guiyang County